Otto Wilhelm von Struve (May 7, 1819 (Julian calendar: April 25) – April 14, 1905) was a Russian astronomer of Baltic German origins. In Russian, his name is normally given as Otto Vasil'evich Struve (Отто Васильевич Струве). Together with his father, Friedrich Georg Wilhelm von Struve, Otto Wilhelm von Struve is considered a prominent 19th century astronomer who headed the Pulkovo Observatory between 1862 and 1889 and was a leading member of the Russian Academy of Sciences.

Early years
Struve was born in 1819 in Dorpat (Tartu), then Russian Empire, as the third son out of eighteen sons and daughters of Friedrich Georg Wilhelm von Struve and Emilie Wall (1796–1834). He graduated from a Dorpat gymnasium at the age of 15 and was one year too young by the university rules. Yet, he was admitted to the Imperial University of Dorpat as a listener and completed the program by the age of 20. While studying, he was assisting his father at the Dorpat Observatory. In 1839, he graduated from the university and moved to the newly opened Pulkovo Observatory, where he was immediately appointed as assistant of the director (his father). For his initial observations, he was given the degree of Master of Astronomy by the University of St. Petersburg in 1841. In 1842, he visited Lipetsk for observations of the solar eclipse and in 1843 defended his PhD. In 1843 Otto formally became a Russian subject.

Scientific work

During 1843 and 1844, Struve participated in longitude measurements between Altona, Greenwich and Pulkovo, which were based on large displacement of chronometers over the Earth surface. This newly developed method was adopted in Russia, and from 1844, the longitude was measured starting not from the Tartu Observatory but from the Pulkovo Observatory. Much of the 1844 Struve dedicated to studying the Sun. He deduced its apex coordinates and linear velocity as 7.3 km/s. Although it was significantly smaller than the correct value of 19.5 km/s measured in 1901, Struve's result was correct in that the velocity of the Sun was smaller than that of stars.

In 1865 he discovered NGC 8, a double star in the constellation Pegasus. This occurred only 2 days after he discovered the spiral galaxy NGC 9 in the constellation Andromeda. Struve explored the constellation of Cassiopeia, finding double stars.  He labeled them with his initials in the Greek alphabet, OΣ in his first catalogue and OΣΣ in his appendix.

Struve continued his father's work in several directions. In particular, they compiled famous Pulkovo catalogues of stellar coordinates, including several thousands double stars observed with a 15-inch refractor. Between 1816 and 1852, the observatory completed the famous survey triangulation measurements of the angular arc (named Struve Geodetic Arc). The measurements extended through over 2,820 km, from Hammerfest in Norway to the Staraya Nekrasovka village by the Black Sea, and aimed to establish the exact size and shape of the Earth.

In 1851, while observing a solar eclipse, he concluded that the solar corona and protuberances are physically connected with the Sun rather than being simply an optical effect, as most astronomers then believed. Later in 1860 he suggested a close connection between solar protuberances and flares. Struve also observed satellites of Uranus (Ariel and Umbriel, in 1851) and of Neptune. He also measured the rings of Saturn and discovered (in parallel with other researchers) the dark inner ring of Saturn. In 1861, in his report to the Academy of Sciences, he had supported and developed the ideas of William Herschel that stars are formed  from the diffuse matter. In 1872, Struve organized assistance with equipment to the newly opened observatory in Tashkent – a southern location offering clear skies for observations. In 1874, he prepared several expeditions to monitor the transit of Venus across the solar disk in eastern Asia, Caucasus, Persia and Egypt. In 1887, he sent several groups within Russia to observe the solar eclipse.  In some of those expeditions, he took part personally. In 1885, a 30-inch refracting telescope was installed at Pulkovo, at the time the largest in the world (see great refractor).

Administration

Around 1845, von Struve's father withdrew from most management activities at the Pulkovo Observatory and focused on individual research. From then on, most of administrative duties fell on von Struve, especially in 1858 when his father was gravely ill. With his father's retirement in 1862, Otto officially became director and kept that position for 27 years until 1889. In the mid-1860s, the son's health deteriorated as well, to the point that neither he nor his physician hoped for recovery. However, instead of retiring, von Struve spent a full winter on leave in Italy and managed to restore his health.

Struve remained a top authority at the Russian Academy and his requests, e.g. regarding staff appointments were always granted. The first refusal, in 1887, disappointed Struve so much that he applied for resignation and was stopped from that only by the Tsar Alexander III, who requested Struve to keep his posts until the 50th anniversary of the Pulkovo Observatory in 1889.

For most of those years, the working language of the Pulkovo Observatory was German, as the staff members were largely foreigners. Struve had only limited command of Russian, yet he used it whenever possible.

Visit to the United States
Otto was the first scientist of the Struve family to visit United States (in 1879: New York, Chicago and San Francisco). The visit served several purposes, including ordering the Alvan Clark & Sons optics for the new 30-inch telescope in Pulkovo, and it was a part of long-term Russia-US astronomy partnership during the 19th century. Within that collaboration, many American astronomers stayed at Pulkovo for observations and exchanged data with Russian scientists by mail. By the initiative of Struve, two US astronomers, Simon Newcomb and Asaph Hall were appointed as Foreign Members of the Russian Academy of Sciences.

Personal life and late years

Struve was married twice. His first wife was a daughter of German emigrants  Emilie Dyrssen (1823–1868). They had four sons and two daughters who reached mature age. A few years after her death, Struve married Emma Jankowsky (1839–1902) and had another daughter with her. Two of his younger sons, Hermann Struve and Ludwig Struve,  continued the traditions of the Struve family and became distinguished astronomers. Of the older sons, one served at the Ministry of Finances and another was geologist. After retirement in 1889, Otto Wilhelm Struve stayed mostly in St. Petersburg, summarizing his observations and keeping correspondence with colleagues. He occasionally visited Switzerland and Italy. During his 1895 trip to Germany, he fell ill to the point of abandoning any further travel. He stayed in Germany and died in 1905 in Karlsruhe.

Awards and honors
Struve won the Gold Medal of the Royal Astronomical Society in 1850 for his work on "The Determination of the Constant of Precession with respect to the Proper Motion of the Solar System" published in 1840 . He was a member of the Royal Swedish Academy of Sciences. Between 1852 and 1889, he was also a member of the Russian Academy of Sciences and became an academician in 1856. In 1874 he became foreign member of the Royal Netherlands Academy of Arts and Sciences. The asteroid 768 Struveana was named in honor of Otto Wilhelm, Friedrich Georg Wilhelm and Karl Hermann Struve; and a lunar crater was named for another 3 astronomers of the Struve family: Friedrich Georg Wilhelm, Otto Wilhelm and Otto. The Struve Geodetic Arc was included to the World Heritage List in 2005.

See also 

 History of the metre
 Seconds pendulum

References

Further reading

1819 births
1905 deaths
Baltic-German people
People from Tartu
Astronomers from the Russian Empire
Recipients of the Gold Medal of the Royal Astronomical Society
University of Tartu alumni
Members of the Royal Netherlands Academy of Arts and Sciences
Members of the Royal Swedish Academy of Sciences
Otto Wilhelm
Foreign Members of the Royal Society
Full members of the Saint Petersburg Academy of Sciences
Foreign associates of the National Academy of Sciences
Recipients of the Pour le Mérite (civil class)
19th-century astronomers